Kerr David Smith (born 12 December 2004) is a Scottish professional footballer who plays as a defender for Premier League club Aston Villa, where he is a member of the Academy squad. He is a product of the Dundee United academy, and made his Scottish Premiership debut there in 2021 aged 16, before joining Aston Villa in January 2022.

Early life 
Smith was born on 12 December 2004 in Montrose, Angus. Smith attended Lochside Primary School in Montrose, Angus. Smith played for Brechin City Boys Club between 2012 and 2014 before signing Dundee United FC academy as a 10 year old.

Club career

Dundee United 
Smith was developed though Dundee United's academy. At the age of 15, he appeared for a youthful Dundee United team in a friendly match against Premier League club Sheffield United in August 2020, which was abandoned after 45 minutes. In the next few weeks, he had trials with Premier League clubs Aston Villa and Manchester United. Despite interest from those clubs and others in England, Smith decided to sign his first professional contract with Dundee United upon reaching his 16th birthday in December 2020. He is under contract until 2023. He was immediately allocated a first team squad number of 43 and was an unused substitute in United's Scottish Premiership match against Rangers the following day.

He made his competitive senior debut for Dundee United as a late substitute in their 4–1 Premiership defeat against Rangers at Ibrox Stadium on 21 February 2021. He then made his first starting appearance in a 3–0 defeat against Kilmarnock at Rugby Park on 21 April 2021.

Aston Villa 
On 14 January 2022, English Premier League club Aston Villa announced Smith as a new signing for their Academy. The transfer fee was undisclosed, but was reported to be worth up to £2 million.

International career 
Smith made his debut for the Scotland U19 team in a 3–0 victory over Gibraltar in a 2022 UEFA European Under-19 Championship qualification match on 13 November 2021.

Career statistics

References

External links 

2004 births
Living people
People from Montrose, Angus
Scottish footballers
Association football defenders
Dundee United F.C. players
Aston Villa F.C. players
Scottish Professional Football League players
Scotland youth international footballers